Downtown is the central business district of a city.

Downtown or Down Town may also refer to:

Places
Downtown, Rotherhithe, an area in London
Downtown (Nevada gaming area), a neighborhood of Las Vegas
Downtown (Washington, D.C.), a neighborhood of Washington, D.C.

Film and television
 Downtown (film), a 1990 American comedy
 Downtown: A Street Tale, a 2004 American drama film
 Downtown (1986 TV series), an American crime drama
 Downtown (1999 TV series), an American animated series
 "Downtown" (American Dad!), a 2020 TV episode

Music

Albums
 Downtown (Marshall Crenshaw album), 1985
 Downtown (Petula Clark album) or the title song (see below), 1965
 Downtown: Life Under the Gun, an EP by August Alsina, or the title song, 2013

Songs
 "Downtown" (Anitta and J Balvin song), 2017
 "Downtown" (Crazy Horse song), or "Come On Baby Let's Go Downtown", 1971
 "Downtown" (Kids of 88 song), 2010
 "Downtown" (Lady Antebellum song), 2013
 "Downtown" (Lloyd Cole song), 1990
 "Downtown" (Macklemore & Ryan Lewis song), 2015
 "Downtown" (Neil Young song), 1995
 "Downtown" (Peaches song), 2006
 "Downtown" (Petula Clark song), written by Tony Hatch, 1964
 "Down Town", by the Justified Ancients of Mu Mu, 1987
 "Down Town" / "Yasashisa ni Tsutsumareta Nara", by Maaya Sakamoto, covering the 1975 song by Sugar Babe (see below), 2010
 "Downtown", by Eraserheads from Sticker Happy, 1997
 "Downtown", by Gotthard from Gotthard, 1992
 "Downtown", by Icona Pop from Icona Pop, 2012
 "Downtown", by Majical Cloudz from Are You Alone?, 2015
 "Downtown", by One 2 Many, 1988
 "Downtown", by SWV from It's About Time, 1993
 "Downtown", by Toh Kay from You By Me: Vol. 1, 2010
 "Down Town", by Sugar Babe, a band featuring Tatsuro Yamashita, 1975
 "Skid Row (Downtown)", from the musical Little Shop of Horrors, 1982

Other
 Downtown music, a category of American music that originated in downtown Manhattan in the 1960s
 Downtown Music Holdings, a global independent rights management and music services company
 Downtown Radio, a radio station based in Northern Ireland
 Downtown Records, an American record label

People
 Fred Brown (basketball) (born 1948), American basketball player
 Downtown Julie Brown (born 1963), English-born actress, DJ and VJ
 Downtown (owarai), the Japanese comedy duo of Masatoshi Hamada and Hitoshi Matsumoto

Transportation
 Downtown MRT line, a mass transit line in Singapore
 Downtown MRT station, a station on the Downtown line
 Downtown station (HART), a planned Honolulu Rail Transit station
 Downtown station (Capital MetroRail), Austin, Texas

Other uses
 Downtown (G.I. Joe), a fictional character in the G.I. Joe universe
 Downtown Hotel, Dawson City, Yukon, Canada
 Down Town (magazine), a Greek weekly
 Downtown, in basketball terminology, the area of the court beyond the three-point line 
 Downtown, a subgroup of the organized Ultras group Horde Zla
 Downtown, a 1994 novel by Anne Rivers Siddons
 Downtown, a 1990 novel by Ed McBain

See also 
 
 
 
 
 Downton (disambiguation)
 Midtown (disambiguation)
 Uptown (disambiguation)